Bakken is a surname of Norwegian origin.

People with the surname Bakken
Alf Bakken, Norwegian politician for the Progress Party
Atle Bakken, Norwegian composer
Anne-Lise Bakken (born 1952), Norwegian politician
Brenda Bakken-Lackey, former Canadian provincial politician 
Christopher Bakken, American poet and professor
Earl Bakken (1924–2018), American engineer, businessman and philanthropist
Inger Marie Bakken, Norwegian politician for the Socialist Left Party.
Ingvar Bakken (1920–1982), Norwegian politician
Janae Bakken, American television producer and screenwriter
Jill Bakken (born 1977), American bobsledder
Jim Bakken (born 1940), American football player
Jon Bakken, Norwegian politician for the Socialist Left Party
Marius Bakken (born 1978), Norwegian runner
Per Bakken, Norwegian Nordic skier 
Terje Bakken (1978–2004), Norwegian singer
Timo André Bakken, Norwegian cross-country skier

See also
Bakken (disambiguation)

Norwegian-language surnames